On 14 March 2014, a group of armed men with knives attacked civilians in Changsha, capital of Hunan. At least 6 people died.

References

History of Hunan
Mass murder in 2014
Mass stabbings in China
Attacks in China in 2014
Terrorist incidents involving knife attacks
Knife attacks
2014 murders in China
21st-century mass murder in China